Gerard Christiaan Wallis de Vries (24 October 1936 – 8 February 2018) was a Dutch politician of the People's Party for Freedom and Democracy (VVD) and corporate director.

Decorations

References

External links

Official
  G.Ch. (Gerard) Wallis de Vries Parlement & Politiek

 

1936 births
2018 deaths
Aldermen of The Hague
Dutch conservationists
Dutch corporate directors
Dutch nonprofit directors
Dutch people of Indonesian descent
Dutch public broadcasting administrators
Erasmus University Rotterdam alumni
Indo people
Knights of the Order of the Netherlands Lion
Municipal councillors of The Hague
People from Batavia, Dutch East Indies
People's Party for Freedom and Democracy politicians
State Secretaries for Social Work of the Netherlands
20th-century Dutch civil servants
20th-century Dutch politicians